Josiah Freeman  was an American photographer, and politician, who in 1882 and 1883, served as a member of the Massachusetts House of Representatives.

References

Members of the Massachusetts House of Representatives
19th-century American photographers
Photographers from Massachusetts
People from Nantucket, Massachusetts